Marie Tifo (born September 26, 1949, in Jonquière, Quebec) is a Canadian actress, and a major star in French-speaking Canada.

She won a Genie Award for Best Performance by an Actress in a Leading Role for her performance in the 1980 drama film Good Riddance (Les Bons débarras).

She played the recurring role of Mathilde Garland in the TVA series Les Sœurs Elliot.

Tifo starred in La Déraison d'amour at the Théâtre du Nouveau Monde in Montreal from 2–13 June 2009, portraying beatified nun Marie de l'Incarnation. This stage biography of Marie Guyard, a widowed mother who crossed the Atlantic to establish the Ursuline order of nuns, had premiered that past fall in Quebec City as part of the 400th anniversary celebrations, then toured France. The script was written by filmmaker Jean-Daniel Lafond for his film Folle de Dieu (Madwoman of God) which also starred Tifo, and premiered in Quebec City in 2008.

Family
Tifo is married to actor and politician Pierre Curzi.

Recognition
 1994 Genie Award for Best Performance by an Actress in a Leading Role - Les Pots cassés - Nominated
 1987 Genie Award for Best Performance by an Actress in a Leading Role - Intimate Power (Pouvoir intime) - Nominated
 1987 Genie Award for Best Performance by an Actress in a Supporting Role - In the Shadow of the Wind (Les Fous de Bassan) - Nominated
 1984 Genie Award for Best Performance by an Actress in a Leading Role - Lucien Brouillard - Nominated
 1984 Genie Award for Best Performance by an Actress in a Leading Role - Just a Game (Rien qu'un jeu) - Nominated
 1981 Genie Award for Best Performance by an Actress in a Leading Role - Good Riddance (Les Bons débarras) - Won

References

External links
 
 
 Watch Madwoman of God at NFB.ca

1949 births
Actresses from Quebec
Best Actress Genie and Canadian Screen Award winners
Canadian film actresses
Canadian television actresses
French Quebecers
Living people
People from Saguenay, Quebec
Spouses of Canadian politicians